Butt welding is the principal method for creating a join between two ends of material. This can include but is not limited to various metals, plastics and other materials. A butt weld requires three key elements under carefully controlled parameters - these include temperature, time and pressure.

Application
Butt welding is a commonly used technique in welding that can either be automated or done by hand.  It is used to attach two materials together such as pipe, framework in factories, and also flanges. A flange is something that either is internal or external that provided to strengthen a piece of material. In factories butt welding has shown how economical it can be for companies to use when building things out of metal. This is because if they wanted to make something out of metal without welding it together they would have to bend everything and reinforce the structure which costs more than welding the two pieces together. Butt welding is accomplished by heating up two pieces of identical material, and applying pressure under a controlled period of time. Butt welding metal requires maintained penetration while welding, and with thin pieces this is possible however, with thick pieces edge preparation may have to be done to prepare the metal. Full penetration butt welds are made when they are in the within the parent(bigger, stronger) metal. Butt welding of plastics requires a machine, in order to align the ends and heat under a controlled temperature and pressure.  In butt welding, the strongest welds are those with the best execution of the three key elements (temperature, time and pressure).

Butt welding metal 

Metal butt welding is best performed with MIG or TIG welding applications due to their natural ability to connect two pieces of metal together. Using different types of welding electrodes for the welder will determine the properties of the weld such as its resistance against corrosion and strength. Electrodes conduct current through the metal being welded in order join the two pieces. The metal determines the type of welding that is required. The electrodes are either heavily or lightly coated. For the heavily coated electrodes are commonly used in structural welding because they are much stronger and corrosion resistant. The lightly coated electrodes are not as structurally sound.  Butt welding is performed with the Arc, TIG, or MIG welder held at a slight angle the weld if the weld is laying flat in order to achieve the least amount of porosity in the weld and also to increase the weld's strength.  Fillet welding make up about 80 percent of the connection despite being weaker than butt welds. The reason it is used more often is because fillet welds offer more room for error with much larger tolerances. Fillet welding is not a type of butt weld despite its similarities.

Butt welding plastic 

A butt welding machine, commonly referred to as a poly welder or fusion machine, is required to heat polyethylene pipe segments under pressure for a period of time. To perform a butt weld correctly and consistently, you will require a butt welding machine capable of aligning the elements to be welded, shaving their ends smooth and parallel, uniformly melting the ends of the pipe under various pressures, then pushing the ends together at a controlled pressure for a specific period.  A correctly performed butt weld on plastic pipe will create a bond far stronger than the segments themselves. Uses of the poly material has grown significantly in recent years due to its light weight, cost-effective production and ability to last 100+ years underground. Butt welding on plastic is done to create pipe systems typically used in water distribution and gas networks.

Types of butt welding

Flash 

Flash butt welding is used with machinery and connects multiple pieces of metal together that are miss matched in size and shape. These different sizings can oftentimes cause for breaks in welding process. High voltage current is applied in order to connect the metal pieces together by applying it to both the components known as flashing in order to join them together.

Resistance 

This weld joins the two pieces of metal together by heat that comes from the pressure due to the metals being held together at a preset force. Resistance butt welding is used on joints that are of similar shape and size and often the weld is performed in one movement unlike flash welding.

Types of butt joints 

There are many different types of butt welding joints and they all are named with their particular shape. The joint also known as a square groove weld has many different forms in order to connect pieces of metal together and are all capable of bearing loads. There are many different types of joints such as lap joints, tee joints, butt joints, and also corner joints. Lap joints are two pieces that are end-over-end and welded together whereas butt welds are put end to end and connected that way. Butt welds are connected to each other with the thickness of the parent metal. There are many different kinds of butt welds such as square, single v, double v, single bevel, double bevel, single u, double u, single j, and also a double j. Minimizing the distortions in a weld is important however doing so will minimize the chances of full penetration. In order to get full penetration double welds such as double v, double j, and double u may be used.

Standards
EN 1993-1-8, which covers the design of joints in the design of steel structures, defines a set of provisions for welding structural steel.

See also
 Fillet weld - a weld of approximately triangular cross section joining two surfaces at approximately right angles to each other
 Plug weld
 Flare groove weld
 Weld access hole
 Welding joint - a joining process that produces a coalescence of metals (or non metals) by heating them to the welding temperature, with or without the application of pressure, or by pressure alone, and with or without the use of filler metals

References

Welding